Kanjar is a tribe with significant populations in India and Pakistan.

The Kanjari language is spoken mostly by the Kanjari people living mostly in Punjab. Kanjari is a lesser-known Indo Aryan language, but almost all also speak Punjabi. The Kanjari speak 4-5 languages along with their native language, called Narsi.It consists of different sounds of animals and birds, coded words, and signs.

History
In the Colonial period, Kanjaris were listed under the Criminal Tribes Act, 1871, as a tribe "addicted to the systematic commission of non-bailable offenses."

Present circumstances

India
The Kanjari were denotified in 1952, when the Criminal Tribes Act was replaced by the Habitual Offenders Act, but the community carries considerable social stigma, mainly due to the association of their culture with traditions distinct from mainstream Indian culture. 

The 2011 Census of India for Uttar Pradesh showed the Kanjari with a population of 115,968.

Pakistan
In Pakistan, two distinct communities go by the name Kanjari. Over the centuries they became associated with the profession of peripatetic craftsmen and entertainers, best known for the terracotta toys they produce. In Karachi, the Urdu-speaking community has large numbers of descendants of Kanjaris from Northern India. Most of them moved from Delhi and Lucknow to Karachi. The term 'Kanjar' is more generally used to refer to a person of low moral character than as a reference to the tribe.

The Kanjaris are sometimes associated with the Lahore neighborhood. They were originally a Hindu tribe, but later some converted to Sikhism and Islam. The famous bazaar flourished under the influence of the Kanjaris of Lucknow and Kanjaris of other  parts of northern India. For centuries Lucknow was a hub for affluent families, who would send their children to be educated in the city. It was believed that Kanjari women carried the roots of Urdu speaking culture. From there many moved to Karachi after the partition was established. In Karachi, such Urdu-speaking families are well educated but their lineage is easily traceable to Kanjaris. Karachi has been home to a large community of Kanjari for centuries. A recent study found that: "A Kanjari hears the music of tabla and ghungroo from the day of her birth and must begin her formal education before her non-Kanjari friends start going to school."

Although nomadic, the Kanjari follow a set route and often maintain a relationship with the villages they visit. Many of the men work as agricultural labourers. Their tents are made from split bamboo or munji grass, and their encampments can be found at the edges of villages, as well as in urban areas such as Faisalabad and Lahore.

Popular culture
They are the subject of the Hindi story Indrajal (Magic in English), by Jaishankar Prasad.

In the Lollywood film Bol, prominent character Saqa Kanjari, financially helps a fanatic hakim after the latter bribes the police to bury the honour killing of his son. The hakim in return had to bear a daughter for Saqa Kanjar's daughter Meena.

See also
Gihara

References

Denotified tribes of India
Scheduled Castes of Rajasthan
Scheduled Castes of Uttar Pradesh
Social groups of Bihar
Social groups of Punjab, Pakistan